Shimoyu Dam is a rockfill dam located in Aomori Prefecture in Japan. The dam is used for flood control and water supply. The catchment area of the dam is 63.7 km2. The dam impounds about 63  ha of land when full and can store 12600 thousand cubic meters of water. The construction of the dam was started on 1971 and completed in 1988.

References

Dams in Aomori Prefecture
1988 establishments in Japan